Sphaeroderus is a genus of beetles in the family Carabidae, found in North America. The genus contains the following species:

 Sphaeroderus bicarinatus (LeConte, 1853)
 Sphaeroderus canadensis Chaudoir, 1861
 Sphaeroderus indianae (Blatchley, 1910)
 Sphaeroderus nitidicollis Guérin-Méneville, 1829
 Sphaeroderus schaumii Chaudoir, 1861 (Schaum's ground beetle)
 Sphaeroderus stenostomus (Weber, 1801)

References

Carabinae
Carabidae genera